Amastris or Amestris may refer to:

People
 Amastris (Amazon)
 Amastris (daughter of Oxyathres), Persian princess, wife of Dionysius of Heraclea
 Amestris, Persian queen, wife of Xerxes I, mother of Artaxerxes I
 Amastris, daughter of Artaxerxes II
 Amastris, daughter of Darius II, wife of Terituchmes

Places
 Amastris (city), now Amasra, in ancient Paphlagonia
 Amestris (Fullmetal Alchemist), a fictional country in the anime and manga series Fullmetal Alchemist

Other
 Amastris (insect), the type genus of the treehopper tribe Amastrini